
This is intended to be a complete list of the African American historic places in West Virginia.  The locations and districts for which the latitude and longitude coordinates are included below, may be seen in a Google map.

Berkeley County 

|}

Cabell County

|}

Fayette County 

|}

Hampshire County 

|}

Harrison County 

|}

Jefferson County 

|}

Kanawha County 

|}

Lewis County

|}

McDowell County

|}

Mercer County

|}

Monongalia County

|}

Pocahontas County 

|}

Preston County

|}

Wood County

|}

See also
 List of National Historic Landmarks in West Virginia
 National Register of Historic Places listings in West Virginia

References

West Virginia-related lists
List of African American historic places in West Virginia
West Virginia
Lists of National Register of Historic Places in West Virginia